Ælfwine the mariner is a fictional character found in various early versions of  J. R. R. Tolkien's Legendarium. Tolkien envisaged Ælfwine as an Anglo-Saxon who visited and befriended the Elves and acted as the source of later mythology. Thus, in the frame story, Ælfwine is the stated author of the various translations in Old English that appear in the twelve-volume The History of Middle-earth edited by Christopher Tolkien.

Frame story: early links with Britain 

In The Book of Lost Tales, begun early in Tolkien's writing career, the character who becomes Ælfwine was named Ottor Wǽfre (called Eriol by the Elves), and his tale serves as a frame story for the tales of the Elves. He set out from what is today called Heligoland on a voyage with a small crew but was the lone survivor after his ship crashed upon the rocks near an island. The island was inhabited by an old man who gave him directions to Eressëa. After he found the island the Elves hosted him in the Cottage of Lost Play and narrated their tales to him. He afterwards learned from the Elves that the old man he met was actually "Ylmir". He was taught most of the tales by the old Elf named Rúmil who is the lore master living on Eressëa. Eriol became more and more unhappy as a man and yearned constantly to be an Elf. He eventually finds out that he can become an elf with a drink of Limpë which he is denied by the leader of Kortirion on multiple occasions.

In these early versions, Tol Eressea is seen as the island of Britain, near a smaller island of Ivenry (Ireland). He earned the name Ælfwine from the Elves he stayed with; his first wife, Cwén, was the mother of Hengest and Horsa; his second wife, Naimi, bore him a third son, Heorrenda, a great poet of half-Elven descent, who in the fiction would go on to write the Old English epic poem Beowulf. This weaves together a mythology for England, connecting England's geography, poetry and mythology with the Legendarium as a plausibly reconstructed (though probably untrue) prehistory.

A presented collection 

The first title for The Book of Lost Tales was

The stories were thus, in the fiction, told to and transmitted by Eriol/Ælfwine, via Heorrenda's written book.

The Tolkien scholar Gergely Nagy writes that Tolkien "more and more emphatically thought of his works as texts within the fictional world" (his emphasis). Tolkien felt that this complex "double textuality" was critically important, giving the effect of being a real mythology, a collection of documents assembled and edited by different hands, whether Ælfwine's  or Bilbo's or those of unnamed Númenóreans who had transmitted ancient Elvish texts, over a long period of time. Nagy notes that Tolkien's friend C. S. Lewis, like him a scholar of English literature, jokingly responded to Tolkien's 1925 The Lay of Leithian by writing a philological commentary on the text complete with invented names of scholars, conjectures as to the original text, and variant readings, as if the text had been discovered in an archive. One likely source for such a treatment, remarked by scholars including Tom Shippey, Flieger, Anne C. Petty, and Jason Fisher, is Elias Lönnrot's Finnish epic Kalevala, admired by Tolkien, which he compiled and edited from a genuine tradition. Another such is Snorri Sturluson's Prose Edda, something that Tolkien studied intensively.

Time-travelling elf-friend 

The Old English name Ælfwine means "Elf-friend", as does the later Quenya name Elendil. Ælfwine is a well-attested historical Germanic name, alongside its Old High German and Lombard equivalents, Alwin and Alboin, respectively.

All of these names were to be used in the unfinished novel The Lost Road, written around 1936–1937; it was intended as a tale of time travel, where descendants of Ælfwine experience racial memories or visions of their equivalently-named ancestors, connecting the present time (with the protagonist Alboin Errol) with the mythological. The time-series was to run all the way back to the fall of Númenor, envisaged as a lost island civilisation similar to Atlantis. The later unfinished novel The Notion Club Papers, written in 1945–1946 and published posthumously in Sauron Defeated, picks up the time travel and the "Elf-friend" names. The protagonist is Alwin Loudham.

The Hobbit Frodo Baggins, a central figure in The Lord of the Rings, is given the informal title "Elf-friend" by an Elf, Gildor, whom he meets and addresses in Elvish. The Tolkien scholar Verlyn Flieger notes that this associates him with Ælfwine; she comments further that in the discussion between him and Sam Gamgee, Aragorn, and Legolas about the nature of time in the Elvish realm of Lothlórien, it endows him with a special authority as someone "unusually sensitive" to its mood, and in particular its "timeless quality". This is in the context of her analysis of how time differs between Lothlórien and what Frodo calls the "mortal lands" outside it. She writes that Ælfwine has what the engineer J. W. Dunne in his book An Experiment with Time described as a "Field 2 observer", effectively able to look down on observers in the lower dimension of time, Field 1, from their higher time dimension like someone in an aircraft seeing the situation of people on the ground below; and by association with Ælfwine, perhaps Frodo too is able to see Elvish time from a certain perspective.

In the later Legendarium 

The Ælfwine frame story is not present in the published version of The Silmarillion, but Tolkien never fully abandoned a framework akin to the Ælfwine-tradition. Even after he had introduced the Red Book of Westmarch, supposedly compiled and translated by the Hobbit Bilbo Baggins as a framing concept, Ælfwine continued to have some role in the transition of The Silmarillion and other writings from Bilbo's translations into modern English. For example, the Narn i Hîn Húrin, which Christopher Tolkien dates to the period after the publication of The Lord of the Rings, has this introductory note: "Here begins that tale which Ǽlfwine made from the Húrinien."

Tolkien never fully dropped the idea of multiple 'voices' (such as of Rumil or Pengolodh in their "Golden Book") who supposedly collected the stories of both Mannish and Elvish sources over the millennia of the world's history. According to Christopher Tolkien, the Akallabêth, which was written in the voice of Pengolodh, in a version that his father had entitled "The Downfall of Númenor", begins "Of Men, Ælfwine, it is said by the Eldar that they came into the world in the time of the Shadow of Morgoth ..." He admits in the History of Middle-earth series that removing this destroyed the whole story's anchorage in the lore of the Eldarin elves, and led him to make changes to the end of the paragraph that would not have met with his father's approval. He points out that the last paragraph of Akallabeth as published in the Silmarillion, still contains indirect references to Ælfwine and other 'future mariners'.

This later Ælfwine was from England, and travelled west to reach the Straight Road, where he either visited the Lonely Island (Tol Eressëa) or only saw its Golden Book with the stories about the Elder Days, the time before the rule of Man, at a distance, or dreamed about the Outer Lands (Middle-earth). He was born in either the 10th or 11th century, and in some versions was connected to English royalty.

References

Primary

Secondary

Sources 

 
 
 
 
 
 
 
  
 
 

Middle-earth Men
Fictional English people